Denis Arthur Allchurch (born 1953) is a Canadian provincial politician. He was a Saskatchewan Party member of the Legislative Assembly of Saskatchewan from 1999 to 2011, representing the constituencies of Shellbrook-Spiritwood from 1999 to 2003 and Rosthern-Shellbrook from 2003 to 2011.

On March 3, 2011, Allchurch lost the party nomination for his constituency. Newcomer Scott Moe, a businessperson from Shellbrook, Saskatchewan, ran as the Saskatchewan Party candidate in the 2011 provincial election. Nomination challenges to sitting MLAs are considered rare events.

Election results 

|-

|NDP
|Ron Blocka
|align="right"|2,553
|align="right"|35.51
|align="right"|

|- bgcolor="white"
!align="left" colspan=3|Total
!align="right"|7,189
!align="right"|100.00
!align="right"|

|-

|NDP
|Lloyd Johnson
|align="right"|2,594
|align="right"|36.54
|align="right"|

References

1953 births
Saskatchewan Party MLAs
Living people
21st-century Canadian politicians